Lecanora substerilis is a species of corticolous (bark-dwelling), crustose lichen in the family Lecanoraceae. It is found in Eastern Europe, in old-growth beech forests of the Carpathian Mountains in the Czech Republic, Slovakia, Romania and Ukraine.

Taxonomy

The lichen was formally described as a new species in 2017 by Jiří Malíček and Zdeněk Vondrák. The species epithet alludes to the fact that the lichen is mostly encountered in the sterile state (i.e., lacking apothecia), and fertile specimens are rare. Lecanora substerilis belongs to the Lecanora subfusca species group.

Description
In sterile individuals, the thallus is thin, less than 0.5 mm thick, while the rare fertile specimens have a more-developed thallus up to 0.5 mm thick that often forms pustules. These pustules are filled with crystals of calcium oxalate. The species contains atranorin and roccellic acid, which are lichen products that can be detected using thin-layer chromatography; sometimes an unidentified fatty acid is also present.

Habitat and distribution
In addition to Slovakia, it has been found in the Uholka-Shyrokyi Luh primeval beech forest in Ukraine, the Parâng Mountains of Romania, and in the Beskid Mountains in the Czech Republic.

See also
List of Lecanora species

References

substerilis
Lichen species
Lichens described in 2017
Lichens of Central Europe
Lichens of Southeastern Europe